D. B. Hoffman served as a member of the 1862-1863 California State Assembly, representing California's 1st State Senate district.

References

Members of the California State Assembly
California state senators